This tree lists various manufacturing processes arranged by similarity of function.

Casting

Centrifugal casting (industrial)
Continuous casting
Die casting
Evaporative-pattern casting
Full-mold casting
Lost-foam casting
Investment casting (Lost-wax casting)
Countergravity casting
Lost-foam casting
Low pressure die casting
Permanent mold casting
Plastic mold casting
Resin casting
Sand casting
Shell molding
Slush casting, Slurry casting
Vacuum molding

Data from Fundamentals of modern manufacturing

Labeling and painting
Main articles: Imaging and Coating
Laser engraving
Inkjet printing
Chemical vapor deposition
Sputter deposition
Plating
Thermal spraying

Moulding

Powder metallurgy
Compaction plus sintering
Hot isostatic pressing
Metal injection moulding
Spray forming
Plastics (see also Rapid prototyping)
Injection
Compression molding
Transfer
Extrusion
Blow molding
Dip moulding
Rotational molding
Thermoforming
Laminating
Expandable bead
Foam
Vacuum plug assist
Pressure plug assist
Matched mould
Shrink wrapping

Forming

End tube forming
Tube beading
Forging
Smith
Hammer forge
Drop forge
Press
Impact (see also Extrusion)
Upset
No draft
High-energy-rate
Cored
Incremental
Powder
Rolling (Thick plate and sheet metal)
Cold rolling
Hot rolling
Sheet metal
Shape
Ring
Transverse
Cryorolling
Orbital
Cross-rolling
Thread
Screw thread
Thread rolling
Extrusion
Impact extrusion
Pressing
Embossing
Stretch forming
Blanking (see drawing below)
Drawing (manufacturing) (pulling sheet metal, wire, bar, or tube
Bulging
Necking
Nosing
Deep drawing (sinks, auto body)
Bending
Hemming
Shearing
Blanking and piercing
Trimming
Shaving
Notching
Perforating
Nibbling
Dinking
Lancing
Cutoff
Stamping
Metal
Leather
Progressive
Coining
Straight shearing
Slitting
Other
Redrawing
Ironing
Flattening
Swaging
Spinning
Peening
Guerin process
Wheelon process
Magnetic pulse
Explosive forming
Electroforming
Staking
Seaming
Flanging
Straightening
Decambering
Cold sizing
Hubbing
Hot metal gas forming
Curling (metalworking)
Hydroforming

Machining

Mills
Grist mill
Hammer mill
Ball mill
Buhrstone mill
Disc mill
Saw mill
Steel mill
Blast furnace
Smelting
Refining
Reduction mill
Annealing
Pickling
Passivate
Coating
Milling
Turning
Lathe
Facing
Boring (also Single pass bore finishing)
Spinning (flow turning)
Knurling
Hard turning
Cutoff (parting)
Drilling
Friction drilling
Reaming
Countersinking
Tapping
Sawing
Filing
Broaching
Shaping
Horizontal
Vertical
Special purpose
Planing
Double housing
Open-side
Edge or plate
Pit-type
Abrasive jet machining
Water jet cutting
Photochemical machining
Abrasive belt
Honing (Sharpening)
Electro-chemical grinding
Finishing & industrial finishing
Abrasive blasting (sand blasting)
Buffing
Burnishing
Electroplating
Electropolishing
Magnetic field-assisted finishing
Etching
Linishing
Mass finishing
Tumbling (barrel finishing)
Spindle finishing
Vibratory finishing
Plating
Polishing
Superfinishing
Wire brushing
Routing
Hobbing
Ultrasonic machining
Electrical discharge
Electrical discharge machining (EDM)
Electron beam machining
Electrochemical machining
Chemical
Photochemical
Laser cutting
Laser drilling
Grinding
High stock removal
Gashing
Biomachining

Joining

Welding
Arc
Manual metal
Shielded metal
Gas metal
Pulsed
Short circuit
Electrogas
Spray transfer
Gas tungsten
Flux-cored
Submerged
Plasma arc
Carbon arc
Stud
Electroslag
Atomic hydrogen
Plasma-MIG (metal inert gas)
Impregnated tape
Regulated Metal Deposition
Oxyfuel gas
Oxy-acetylene gas
Methylacetylene propadiene (MAPP)
Air-acetylene
Oxyhydrogen
Pressure gas
CO2
Resistance
Butt welding
Flash butt welding
Shot welding
Spot welding
Projection welding
Seam
Upset welding
Percussion (manufacturing)
Solid state welding
Ultrasonic
Explosive
Diffusion
Hot press
Isostatic hot gas
Vacuum furnace
Friction welding
Inertia
Forge
Cold
Roll
Electron beam welding
Laser welding
Thermite
Induction
Low frequency (50–450 Hz)
High frequency (induction resistance; 200–450 kHz)
Others
Heated metal plate
Solvent
Dielectric
Magnetic pulse welding
Radio frequency welding
High frequency resistance
Electromagnetic
Flow
Resistance
Infrared
Vacuum
Hot-air-welding
Brazing
Torch
Induction brazing
Furnace
Dip
Soldering
Iron
Hot plate
Oven
Induction
Dip
Wave
Ultrasonic
Sintering
Adhesive bonding (incomplete)
Thermo-setting and thermoplastic
Epoxy
Modified epoxy
Phenolics
Polyurethane
Adhesive alloys
Miscellaneous other powders, liquids, solids, and tapes
Fastening wood and metal
Nailing
Screwing
(By material fastened)
Machine (Metal)
Wood Screws
(By slot type)
Phillips ("Plus sign" in Canada)
Straight ("Minus sign" in Canada)
(By shape)
Round head
Flat head
Box head
Hex
Lag
Nut and bolts
Riveting
Clinching
Pinning
Cotter
Groove
Tapered
Roll
Retaining rings
Quick release skewer
Stitching
Stapling
Press fitting

Additive manufacturing
3D printing
Direct metal laser sintering
Filament winding, produces composite pipes, tanks, etc.
Fused deposition modeling
Inkjet Printing
Laminated object manufacturing
Laser engineered net shaping
Layered manufacturing
Rapid Induction Printing
Selective laser sintering
Spark plasma sintering
Stereolithography

Other

Mining
Quarrying
Blasting
Crushing
Chemical manufacturing
Petroleum refining
Semiconductor fabrication
Assembly line
Packaging and labeling
Logistics
Woodworking
Joinery (see also Joining, above)
Lapping
Mortising
Routing (see above)
Biscuit joiner
Vulcanization
Heat treating
Bake-out

See also
Worker–machine activity chart

References

Processes